Coy is both a surname and a given name. Notable people with the name include:

Surname:
 Bernard Coy (1991), an American bank robber, famous for trying to escape from Alcatraz prison
 Bobby Coy, English former football player
 Eric Coy, Canadian Olympic discus thrower and shot putter
 John Coy, American children's book author
 Jeffrey Coy (1951-2018), American politician
 Jonathan Coy, British actor
 Juan Coy, Minister of State for Human Development in Belize
 Michelle Coy, British bobsledder
 Randi Coy, participant in the reality show My Big Fat Obnoxious Fiance
 Steve Coy, English drummer, manager, producer, and songwriter for new wave band Dead or Alive
 Ted Coy, American college football player
 Wayne Coy, chairman of the Federal Communications Commission (1947-1952)

Given name:
 Coy Gibbs, former NASCAR car driver and National Football League (NFL) assistant coach
 Coy Bacon, former NFL player
 Coy Bowles, guitarist and keyboardist in Zac Brown Band
 Coy Cronk (born 1998), American football player
 Coy Wire, NFL player
 Coy Watson Jr., American child actor
 Coy Cook, American singer
 Coy "Luke" Perry, American actor
 Coy Privette, Baptist pastor and politician under the shadow of a scandal
 Coy Pugh (born 1952), American politician

Fictional characters:
 Coy Duke, fictional character on the TV show The Dukes of Hazzard

See also
Koy (name), given name and surname